St. Philip's Episcopal Church is a historic Episcopal church located at 141 E. 9th Street in Trenton, Grundy County, Missouri.  It was built in 1898, and is a small, one-story, Gothic Revival style limestone building.  It has a high gable on the primary facade, a clerestoried chancel with projecting polygonal apse, and locally crafted windows of
colored cathedral glass.

It was listed on the National Register of Historic Places in 1979.

References

Churches completed in 1898
Episcopal church buildings in Missouri
Churches on the National Register of Historic Places in Missouri
Gothic Revival church buildings in Missouri
Buildings and structures in Grundy County, Missouri
19th-century Episcopal church buildings
1898 establishments in Missouri
National Register of Historic Places in Grundy County, Missouri